The spotted snake eel (Myrichthys tigrinus), also known as the tiger snake eel or the spotted tiger snake eel, is an eel in the family Ophichthidae (worm/snake eels). It was described by Charles Frédéric Girard in 1859. It is a marine, tropical eel which is known from the eastern central and southeastern Pacific Ocean, including Chile, Costa Rica, Colombia, El Salvador, Ecuador, Mexico, Guatemala, Nicaragua, Panama, Honduras, and Peru.

The spotted snake-eel is of no commercial interest to fisheries. Due to its wide distribution in the eastern Pacific, its lack of known threats and lack of observed population decline, the IUCN redlist currently lists the species as Least Concern.

References

External links
 

spotted snake-eel
Fish of the Gulf of California
Western Central American coastal fauna
spotted snake-eel